This is a list of lakes in Michigan. The American state of Michigan borders four of the five Great Lakes.

The number of inland lakes in Michigan depends on the minimum size. There are: 
 62,798 lakes ≥ 
 26,266 lakes ≥ 
 6,537 lakes ≥ 
 1,148 lakes ≥ 
 98 lakes ≥ 
 10 lakes ≥ 

Many lakes share names, some of the most common are Clear Lake, Indian Lake, Long Lake, Mud Lake, Round Lake and Silver Lake.



See also

 
 List of lakes in the United States
 List of lakes of the United States by area

References

General references

External links
 Michigan Department of Natural Resources website of Inland Lake Maps by County

 
 
Michigan